David Burns (13 March 1934 – 29 November 2010) was a Scottish footballer who played in the Scottish Football League for Kilmarnock, St Johnstone, Arbroath and East Fife.

References

1934 births
2010 deaths
Place of death missing
Footballers from Fife
Scottish footballers
Scottish Football League players
Association football wingers
Petershill F.C. players
Kilmarnock F.C. players
St Johnstone F.C. players
Arbroath F.C. players
East Fife F.C. players
People from Buckhaven
Scottish Junior Football Association players